New Galloway was a royal burgh that elected one Commissioner to the Parliament of Scotland before 1707.

Constituency
New Galloway in the Stewartry of Kirkcudbright was made a royal burgh by charter of Charles I in 1630, and this was confirmed by Act of Parliament in 1633.

Burgh Commissioners
 1633-1644: Robert Gordon of Knockbrex
 1661–1663, 1667 convention, 1669–1674: Robert Dickson of Bughtrig
 1685-1686: Robert Alexander, merchant
 1689 convention, 1689-1690: James Gordon of Craichlaw (died 1690)
 1690-1702: Hugh Dalrymple of North Berwick
 1703-1707: George Home of Whitfield

See also
 List of constituencies in the Parliament of Scotland at the time of the Union

References
Joseph Foster, Members of Parliament, Scotland (London and Aylesbury, 1882)

Burghs represented in the Parliament of Scotland (to 1707)
History of Galloway
Politics of Dumfries and Galloway
1633 establishments in Scotland
1707 disestablishments in Scotland
Constituencies established in 1633
Constituencies disestablished in 1707